Bernie Sanders (born 1941) is a United States Senator from Vermont since 2007.

Senator Sanders may also refer to:

Former members of the United States Senate
Newell Sanders (1850–1938), U.S. Senator from Tennessee from 1912 to 1913
Wilbur F. Sanders (1834–1905), U.S. Senator from Montana from 1890 to 1893

United States state senate members
Archie D. Sanders (1857–1941), New York State Senate
Carl Sanders (1925–2014), Georgia State Senate
David J. Sanders (born 1975), Arkansas State Senate
Henry Sanders (politician) (born 1942), Alabama State Senate
Jared Y. Sanders Jr. (1892–1960), Louisiana State Senate
Richie Sanders (born 1963), Kentucky State Senate

See also
Senator Saunders (disambiguation)